At the 1981 Central African Games, the athletics events were held in Luanda, Angola from 20 August – 30 September.

A total of 34 track and field events were contested (20 for men and 14 for women). Compared to the previous edition, a men's hammer throw event and the women's 3000 metres and 100 metres hurdles were added to the programme. Cameroon repeated as the medal leader in athletics, winning twelve events and a total of 25 medals. Gabon had the second highest number of gold medals (seven) while the Republic of the Congo has the second highest tally with 22 medals. The host Angola won 19 medals. A total of nine of the ten competing nations reached the medal table.

Seven athletes won multiple individual titles at the games. On the men's side, Théophile Nkounkou won a short sprints double for Congo, Burundi's Evariste Haritwinshi scored a middle-distance double, and Bernardo Manuel took a long-distance double for the host nation. Among the women, Cameroon's Ruth Enang Mesode did a sprint double, Marcianne Mukamurenzi of Rwanda won the 1500 metres and 3000 metres titles, Cameroonian heptathlete Cécile Ngambi won the high jump and 100 metres hurdles, and her teammate Agnès Tchuinté won both the discus throw and javelin throw.

Six individuals successfully retained their titles from the 1976 edition: Théophile Nkounkou (men's 100 m), Paul Ngadjadoum (men's high jump), Jean-Emmanuel Vanlier (men's discus), Kémobé Djimassal (men's long jump), Cécile Ngambi (women's high jump) and Agnès Tchuinté (women's javelin). The standard of performances improved across the board, with games records being set in 24 of the 34 events contested – 19 of the games records set went unbeaten in the competition's history.

Medal summary

Men

Women

Medal table

References

Results
Central African Games. GBR Athletics. Retrieved on 2011-03-13.

1981
1981
1981 Central African Games
Central African Games
1981 Central African Games